Michael David Hedlund (born August 11, 1946) is a former Major League Baseball pitcher who played for six seasons. He played for the Cleveland Indians in 1965 and 1968 and the Kansas City Royals from 1969 to 1972.

Cleveland Indians
He was just eighteen years old when he made his major league debut on May 8,  against the Boston Red Sox. He appeared in just six games, and pitched a total of 5.1 innings before returning to the minors.

After the season, he was selected by the Kansas City Royals in the 1968 Major League Baseball expansion draft.

Kansas City Royals
Hedlund went 3–6 with a 3.24 earned run average during the Royals' inaugural season. Used as both a starter and relief pitcher, he was far more effective out of the bullpen, posting a 1.69 ERA and earning two saves. His finest start came on September 18 when he held the Oakland Athletics to just one run, and struck out eight to earn the complete game victory.

After the season, Hedlund pitched for Tiburones de La Guaira in the Venezuelan Professional Baseball League. He set a league record by not allowing an earned run for the first 53 innings he pitched, and finishing with a 0.75 ERA. While in Venezuela, Hedlund would contract the Hong Kong flu and bronchitis, causing him to lose thirty pounds. But he recovered and served as a reinforcement for the Navegantes del Magallanes, eventual champions of the  1970 Caribbean Series.

In , the Royals boasted one of the most talented young starting rotations in the majors with Hedlund, Dick Drago and Paul Splittorff all under 27 years old. After narrowly avoiding one hundred losses in 1970, the Royals improved to 85–76, in 1971 to finish second in the American League West. For his part, Hedlund rebounded to go 15–8 in with the league's fourth best ERA, 2.71. After the season, Hedlund traveled to Vietnam with a group of Major League ballplayers on a tour of hospitals and military bases.

Hedlund started  in the Royals' rotation, but after starting the season 0–5, was moved into the bullpen. He improved considerably at that point; winning his next four starts when used by manager Bob Lemon as a spot starter. At the 1972 Winter meetings he was traded back to the Cleveland Indians for utility infielder Kurt Bevacqua.

Minor leagues
The Indians intended to use Hedlund as a long reliever and spot starter, but he failed to make the club out of Spring training. He spent the entire  season with the triple A Oklahoma City 89ers, going 7–8 with a 4.44 ERA. The following Spring, he was traded to the Chicago White Sox for minor league outfielder Ken Hottman. He was traded again after the season, this time to the Cincinnati Reds for Ozzie Osborn, but never played a game with them at any level.

Sources

External links

Venezuelan Professional Baseball League statistics

1946 births
Baseball players from Dallas
Burlington Indians players (1958–1964)
Cleveland Indians players
Iowa Oaks players
Kansas City Royals players
Living people
Major League Baseball pitchers
Oklahoma City 89ers players
Omaha Royals players
Pawtucket Indians players
Portland Beavers players
Tiburones de La Guaira players
American expatriate baseball players in Venezuela
Waterbury Indians players
American people of Swedish descent